Sophta ruficeps is a moth of the family Erebidae first described by Francis Walker in 1864. It is found in Sri Lanka, Korea, Japan, Taiwan and Borneo.

References

Moths of Asia
Moths described in 1864
Boletobiinae